The R506 is a Regional Route in South Africa.

Route
It runs north-east south-west. The northern end takes origin from the R507 just south-east of Delareyville, North West. The first town it passes through is Migdol. From there it reaches Schweizer-Reneke. It becomes co-signed with the R34 and while so designated crosses the R504 and the Harts River. South of the town, the R506 splits and exits the town south-south-west and continues to Christiana, where it ends at a t-junction with the R708.

References

Regional Routes in North West (South African province)